Ricardo Goulart Pereira (born 5 June 1991), known as Ricardo Goulart, is a Brazilian professional footballer who plays as an attacking midfielder for Bahia.

Goulart started his career with Santo André in 2009, and remained at the club until 2011, with a loan to Internacional. He played the 2012 season Goiás in the second tier, before joining Cruzeiro the following year.

At Cruzeiro, Goulart cemented a place in the first team, and during his two-year stint, he made a total of 99 appearances and scored 34 times, winning the 2014 Brasileiro with the club. His personal awards include the 2014 Bola de Ouro, besides featuring in the team of the season. In 2015, he entered Asian football by signing for Chinese club Guangzhou Evergrande, where he won the Chinese Super League and AFC Champions League in his first season.

Goulart made his international debut for the Brazil national football team against Colombia in 2014.

Club career

Santo André
Born in São José dos Campos, São Paulo, Goulart joined Santo André's youth setup in 2006, after failed trials at São Paulo, São Caetano, Taubaté and Paulista. In the 2009 season, after being the under-20's top scorer in the Copa São Paulo de Futebol Júnior, he was then promoted to the first team.

Goulart made his first team debut for Ramalhão on 25 February 2009, coming on as a second-half substitute and scoring the equalizer in a 2–1 Campeonato Paulista home win over Ituano. He scored four times in 12 appearances in the competition, as the club finished sixth.

Goulart made his Série A debut on 24 May 2009, replacing Antônio Flávio in a 1–2 home loss against Flamengo. He scored his first goal in the category on 25 July, but in a 2–3 loss at Grêmio, and featured sparingly in the league as his side suffered relegation.

Loan to Internacional
On 19 May 2010, Goulart was loaned to Internacional for one year, and was initially assigned to the B-team.

After winning the 2010 Copa FGF with the B's, Goulart was included in the main squad ahead of the 2011 campaign, and started the season as a starter. However, after the arrival of Dorival Júnior as manager, he lost space in the main squad and returned to his parent club when his loan expired in December 2011; Santo André also refused to keep him, and he was subsequently released.

Goiás
On 28 December 2011, Goulart agreed to a contract with Série B Goiás for the ensuing campaign. He made his debut for the club on 22 January, starting in a 5–0 Campeonato Goiano home routing of Aparecidense, and scored his first goal three days later in a 4–2 win at Morrinhos.

An immediate starter, Goulart won the 2012 Campeonato Goiano and the 2012 Série B with the side, scoring 25 goals overall and providing 14 assists as the club returned to the top tier. He notably scored three braces in the campaign, against Goianésia (2–1 home win), Ipatinga (6–0 away win) and Guaratinguetá (3–0 away win).

Cruzeiro
On 5 January 2013, Goulart was announced at Cruzeiro in the top tier. He made his debut for the club on 3 February, starting in a 2–1 Campeonato Mineiro home win over rivals Atlético Mineiro, and scored his first goal on 24 March in a 2–1 home win over Caldense.

Goulart was the league top scorer of Cruzeiro in his first season (along with Borges), scoring 10 goals as the club lifted the trophy. In August 2014, after winning the 2014 Mineiro, he was targeted by French club Monaco, but the offer was refused by Cruzeiro.

In the 2014 Copa Libertadores, Goulart was again the club's top goalscorer (along with Bruno Rodrigo), scoring four goals (including a hat-trick in a 5–1 home routing of Universidad de Chile) as his side was knocked out in the quarterfinals. In the year's Série A, he scored 15 goals and was the club's top goalscorer as they lifted a second consecutive league title. He was also named in the team of the season by CBF, and won the Bola de Ouro and Bola de Prata awards by Placar.

Guangzhou Evergrande

First seasons
In early January 2015, Goulart was linked to a move away from Cruzeiro to China and Mexico. On 13 January, he signed for Chinese Super League club Guangzhou Evergrande for € 15 million, on a four-year contract, being handed the no 11 jersey. It was the highest transfer fee paid by a Chinese club.

Goulart made his debut on 14 February 2015, replacing countryman Renê Júnior in a match against Shandong Luneng in Chinese Super Cup. He scored his first goal for his club on 25 February, in an AFC Champions League match against FC Seoul. He then scored a hat-trick in the same competition, against the defending champions Western Sydney Wanderers on 4 March. For his performance he was praised by manager Fabio Cannavaro who said "Goulart is undoubtedly a great player. As an individual player or as a team player he is helping us significantly".

Goulart's goal scoring form continued, as he again found the net by scoring a brace against Japanese club Kashima Antlers on 18 March 2015. In the league, he scored 19 goals as the club won their fifth title in a row.

On 22 February 2016, Goulart extended his contract with Guangzhou Evergrande to 31 January 2020. He again scored 19 league goals in that year, as the club won their sixth consecutive title. In 2017, he scored a career-best 20 goals, with Guangzhou winning another title.

Loan to Palmeiras and return
On 15 January 2019, Goulart moved to Palmeiras on a one-year deal, with a buyout clause. On 23 May, after struggling with injuries and only 12 matches, his loan was cut short and he returned to his parent club.

Goulart struggled with knee injuries for the remainder of the 2019 season, and did not play a single minute as the club had four foreign players registered.

Loan to Hebei China Fortune
On 19 July 2020, Goulart joined Hebei China Fortune on loan for the remainder of the year. He contributed with 18 appearances for the side, as they were knocked out of the league by his parent club.

2021 season
Back to Guangzhou for the 2021 campaign, Goulart featured sparingly before terminating his contract in November 2021 in a mutual consent. It was reported that due to the financial difficulties of the club, the club failed to pay his wage.

Santos
On 11 January 2022, free agent Goulart was announced at Santos back in his home country, after agreeing to a two-year contract. He made his debut for the club on 2 February, starting in a 2–1 away win over rivals Corinthians.

Goulart scored his first goal for Peixe on 13 February 2022, netting the winner in a 2–1 home success over Ituano. However, he struggled to establish himself as a regular starter, and terminated his contract with the club on 12 July.

International career
On 19 August 2014, Goulart was called up to the Brazil national team for two matches against Colombia and Ecuador by new manager Dunga. After being an unused substitute against the former, he made his full international debut on 9 September, in a 1–0 victory against the latter.

Having only played a friendly match for Brazil, Goulart was subsequently naturalized as a Chinese citizen, being one of the six football players at the time who had no Chinese ancestry to have been naturalized as Chinese citizens, with another notable player being Elkeson, another former Brazilian. However, it became unclear whether he would be able to represent the national team, as he did not complete the five-year residency rules after leaving the country between October 2018 and May 2019.

Style of play
A versatile, tenacious, and physically strong attacking midfielder, with an eye for goal, Goulart is also capable of playing as a forward, through the centre, or as a winger, on either flank. He is known in particular for his powerful ball striking, and his ability to make attacking runs into the area.

Personal life
In 2009, Goulart married Diane. His brother Juninho is also a footballer, best known for his tenure with MLS club LA Galaxy.

Goulart became a naturalised Chinese citizen on 17 July 2019. After leaving Guangzhou in November 2021, Chinese media reported that he gave up on his Chinese nationality as he returned to Brazil, but he was still registered as a foreigner in the 2022 season, as he did not start the documentation process to get back his Brazilian nationality.

Career statistics

Club
.

International

Honours

Club
Internacional
 Copa FGF: 2010

Cruzeiro
 Campeonato Brasileiro Série A: 2013, 2014

Guangzhou Evergrande
 AFC Champions League: 2015
 Chinese Super League: 2015, 2016, 2017
 Chinese FA Cup: 2016
 Chinese FA Super Cup: 2016, 2017, 2018

Individual
 Bola de Ouro: 2014
 Bola de Prata: 2014
 Campeonato Brasileiro Série A Team of the Year: 2014
 Chinese Football Association Footballer of the Year: 2015, 2016
 Chinese Super League Team of the Year: 2015, 2016, 2017
 AFC Champions League Top Scorer: 2015
 AFC Champions League Most Valuable Player: 2015
 AFC Foreign Player of the Year: 2015
 Chinese FA Super Cup Most Valuable player: 2016
 Chinese Super League Golden Boot winner: 2016

See also 
List of Chinese naturalized footballers

References

External links
 

1991 births
Living people
Brazilian people of French descent
Brazilian footballers
Brazil international footballers
Campeonato Brasileiro Série A players
Campeonato Brasileiro Série B players
Esporte Clube Santo André players
Sport Club Internacional players
Goiás Esporte Clube players
Cruzeiro Esporte Clube players
Guangzhou F.C. players
Sociedade Esportiva Palmeiras players
Hebei F.C. players
Santos FC players
Esporte Clube Bahia players
Expatriate footballers in China
Brazilian emigrants to China
Chinese Super League players
Brazilian expatriate footballers
People from São José dos Campos
Association football midfielders
Chinese footballers
Naturalized citizens of the People's Republic of China
Footballers from São Paulo (state)